Chersadaula ochrogastra is a species of moth in the family Oecophoridae. This species is endemic to New Zealand. It is classified as "Data Deficient" by the Department of Conservation.

Taxonomy 
This species was described by Edward Meyrick in 1923 from specimens obtained by George Hudson at Breaker Bay in Wellington. Hudson found larvae of the species in September and raised them to adulthood in November. Hudson discussed and illustrated this species in his 1928 publication The Moths and Butterflies of New Zealand. The lectotype is held at the Natural History Museum, London.

Description 
The eggs of this species are white and approximately 3mm in length, and cylindrical in shape although slightly broader at one end.

The larvae, when fully grown, are approximately 2 cm long and are cylinder shaped with a tapered end. The head is bright yellowish-brown, the first part of the larvae is yellowish-white, then tinged with black, then whitish with irregular tinges of chocolate brown.

Meyrick described the adult moths of the species as follows:

Distribution 
It is endemic to New Zealand. It has been found in the North Island. However this species has not been collected since 1923.

Biology and behaviour 
Larvae have been found under stones. Adults emerge in early November. The adult female of this species has noticeable wing reduction and is incapable of flight.

Host species and habitat 
The female adult moths place their eggs indiscriminately and they are not attached to anything. The larvae of this moth live in silken cocoons in the earth and feed on grass roots. The preferred habitat of the larvae of this species is along the sea-coast, about three metres above the high tide mark.

Conservation status 
This species has been classified as having the "Data Deficient" conservation status under the New Zealand Threat Classification System.

References

External links
Image of lectotype specimen
 Chersadaula ochrogastra in species id

Moths described in 1923
Oecophoridae
Endemic fauna of New Zealand
Taxa named by Edward Meyrick
Moths of New Zealand
Endemic moths of New Zealand